Industrias de Aceite S.A. doing business as Alicorp Bolivia or FINO, is a Bolivian consumer food and personal care products company that specializes in food and cooking oils, particularly soybean-derived oils. It is a wholly owned international subsidiary of Alicorp. Industrias de Aceite is headquartered in Santa Cruz with a large plant located in Warnes. It also has a plant in Cochabamba. It is known for its FINO brand oils and spreads.

History
The company was founded in 1944 in the city of Cochabamba. The FINO brand was introduced in 1954. Production in the Warnes plant began in 1977.

In 2018 it merged with ADM-SAO S.A., subsidiary of Archer Daniels Midland, and was acquired by Peruvian consumer goods company Alicorp S.A.A. for 292 million USD.  The deal closed April 1st, 2019.

Products
The products of Industrias de Aceite include:

 Aceite Fino
 Aceite Fino Mental Activ
 Detergente UNO PRO
 Suavizante Uno Caricias
 Aceite Fino Light
 Jabon UNO
 Jabon AZO
 Jabon OSO
 Manteca Karina
 Manteca Gordito
 Margarina Regia
 Margarina Regia Light
 Primor

Distributed by FINO:

 Van Camp's
 Borges
 Plusbelle
 Don Vittorio
 Mimaskot
 Bolívar
 Nutregal
 Victoria
 Super

References

External links
 Company website

Companies of Bolivia
Food and drink companies established in 1944
1944 establishments in Bolivia
Bolivian brands
Food and drink companies of Bolivia